Elie Keyrouz (born 1958) is a Lebanese Maronite  politician and a member of the Lebanese Forces party. He has been an MP in the Lebanese Parliament as a representative of Bsharri District since the 2005 legislative elections.
Kayrouz has been the head of Bcharre bureau in the LF since 1992. He was arrested in August, 2001 in a crackdown on Anti-Syrian Christian groups (namely, the LF and the Free Patriotic Movement) and released on bail in November.
He is married with three children.

See also
Lebanese Forces
List of Lebanese Forces Deputies in the Lebanese Parliament

References

Lebanese Maronites
1959 births
Living people
Lebanese Forces politicians
Members of the Parliament of Lebanon
Lebanese lawyers
Saint Joseph University alumni
People from Bsharri